The 1963 Green Bay Packers season was their 45th season overall and their 43rd season in the National Football League. The two-time defending NFL champions finished with an 11–2–1 record under fifth-year head coach Vince Lombardi for a second-place finish in the Western Conference, a half game back.

The Packers had won the previous five regular season games with rival Chicago, but scored just ten points total in the two games in 1963, and needed only a tie in one of them to advance to the championship game. (The tie at Detroit on Thanksgiving did not impact the Packers' title chances; ties were omitted from the winning percentage calculation until .)  Chicago's only loss was at last place San Francisco in October and they tied Pittsburgh and Minnesota in consecutive weeks after their second defeat of the Packers.

Quarterback Bart Starr suffered a hairline fracture in his passing hand at St. Louis on October 20. Up 23–0 in the third quarter, Starr couldn't find an open receiver on third down and took off on a run that gained 15 yards, tackled with a late hit out of bounds by Cardinal cornerback Jimmy "Iron Claw" Hill, who was ejected. Second-string quarterback John Roach filled in for the rest of the game, a 30–7 win in  heat, and the next four starts. Zeke Bratkowski was acquired in late October, waived by the Rams, and saw some action, too. Starr returned a month later, in week eleven on November 24 against San Francisco in Milwaukee, a week after the second loss to Chicago.

Following their regular season finale, a 21–17 win at San Francisco on Saturday, Green Bay needed Detroit to defeat the Bears at Wrigley Field on Sunday. The game's progress was updated to the Packers during their flight home; Chicago's 24–14 win ended Green Bay's bid for an unprecedented third consecutive championship game win. They eventually accomplished that feat with titles in 1965, 1966 and 1967.

In the third place Playoff Bowl in Miami three weeks later on January 5, the Packers overwhelmed the Cleveland Browns, 40–23. Green Bay led 28–10 at halftime and extended it to 38–10 in the fourth quarter.

This was the eleventh and final season for Pro Football Hall of Fame center Jim Ringo as a Packer. In May 1964, he and reserve fullback Earl Gros were traded to the Philadelphia Eagles for linebacker Lee Roy Caffey and a first round  Ringo played four years with the Eagles and then went into coaching; the draft pick was used to select halfback Donny Anderson as a "future" pick in the 1965 NFL Draft.

Hall of Fame halfback Hornung did not play this season, suspended in April by commissioner Pete Rozelle for betting on NFL games and associating with 

For the thirteenth consecutive year, the Packers played on Thanksgiving Day, all against the Detroit Lions at Tiger Stadium. Green Bay next played on Thanksgiving in 1970 at the Cotton Bowl, which was the franchise's first-ever loss to the Dallas Cowboys.

Roster

Schedule

Note: Intra-conference opponents are in bold text.

Game summaries

Week 1 vs Bears

Week 2

Standings

Playoff Bowl
The Playoff Bowl matched the runners-up of the two conferences to determine third place in the league. It was played in January at the Orange Bowl in Miami, Florida, the week following the NFL Championship game.

Source:

References

Sportsencyclopedia.com

External links
PackersHistory.net – 1963 season

Green Bay Packers seasons
Green Bay Packers
Green